The following television stations broadcast on digital or analog channel 3 in Canada:

 CFCN-TV-10 in Fernie, British Columbia
 CFQC-TV-1 in Stranraer, Saskatchewan
 CFRN-TV-2 in Peace River, Alberta
 CFTK-TV in Terrace, British Columbia
 CHAN-TV-2 in Bowen Island, British Columbia
 CHAU-DT-1 in Sainte-Marguerite-Marie, Quebec
 CHBC-TV-6 in Celista, British Columbia
 CICI-TV-1 in Elliot Lake, Ontario
 CISA-TV-1 in Burmis, Alberta
 CISA-TV-2 in Brooks, Alberta
 CITM-TV in 100 Mile House, British Columbia
 CITO-TV in Timmins, Ontario
 CJCB-TV-6 in Port Hawkesbury, Nova Scotia
 CKKM-TV in Oliver/Osoyoos, British Columbia
 CKLT-TV-1 in Florenceville, New Brunswick
 CKRN-TV-3 in Béarn/Fabre, Quebec
 CKTN-TV-3 in Nelson, British Columbia

03 TV stations in Canada